The 2001 NCAA Women's Division I Swimming and Diving Championships were contested at the 20th annual NCAA-sanctioned swim meet to determine the team and individual national champions of Division I women's collegiate swimming and diving in the United States. 

This year's events were hosted at the Nassau County Aquatic Center in East Meadow, Long Island, New York.

Two-time defending champions Georgia once again topped the team standings for the first time, finishing a mere 1 points ahead of Stanford. This was the Bulldogs' third women's team title.

Team standings
Note: Top 10 only
(DC) = Defending champions
Full results

See also
List of college swimming and diving teams

References

NCAA Division I Swimming And Diving Championships
NCAA Division I Swimming And Diving Championships
NCAA Division I Women's Swimming and Diving Championships